Guarany Futebol Clube, commonly referred to as Guarany de Bagé, is a Brazilian football club based in Bagé, Rio Grande do Sul. It currently plays in Campeonato Gaúcho Série A2, the second level of the Rio Grande do Sul state football league.

History
On April 19, 1907, Guarany was founded by eleven friends at Praça da Matriz (Matriz Square). The club was named after Carlos Gomes' Il Guarany. Carlos Garrastazú, one of the club's founders, was Guarany's first president.

Titles
Campeonato Gaúcho: 1920 and 1938.
Campeonato Gaúcho Second Division: 2006.
Campeonato Gaúcho Third Division: 1999, 2016, 2019

Rival
Guarany's greatest rival is Bagé. The derby between the clubs is called Ba-Gua.

References

External links
 Guarany's official website

 
Association football clubs established in 1907
Football clubs in Rio Grande do Sul
1907 establishments in Brazil